Beeler is an unincorporated community in Ness County, Kansas, United States.  It lies along K-96, west of the city of Ness City, the county seat of Ness County.  Its elevation is 2,490 feet (759 m), and it is located at  (38.4444607, -100.1948550).  It has a post office with the ZIP code 67518.

History
Beeler was a station and shipping point on the Atchison, Topeka and Santa Fe Railway. Elmer Beeler, the town's founder, is its namesake.

The first post office in Beeler was established in 1886 as Beelerville. The post office was discontinued in 2009.

Climate
The climate in this area is characterized by hot, humid summers and generally mild to cool winters.  According to the Köppen Climate Classification system, Beeler has a humid subtropical climate, abbreviated "Cfa" on climate maps.

References

Further reading

External links

 Communities in Ness County
 Ness County maps: Current, Historic, KDOT

Unincorporated communities in Ness County, Kansas
Unincorporated communities in Kansas